Dorothy Mary L. Burroughes (1883-18 July 1963) was a British artist known as a painter, illustrator and linocut artist. She designed posters and wrote and illustrated a series of children's books.

Biography
Burroughes was born and lived most of her life in London, although in her later years she lived near Henley-on-Thames.
She studied at the Slade School of Art and at Heatherley's in London before furthering her studies in Germany. Burroughes produced illustrations for a number of magazines including Bystander, Sketch and the Illustrated London News. She produced posters for the London Underground, including the poster For the Zoo in the style of a Japanese colour woodcut. Throughout the 1930s and into the 1940s she wrote and illustrated a series of children's books, often on animal themes. Animals were also a recurring theme in the prints she produced as were cloud formations. Her prints often featured towering banks of cumulus clouds above an English landscape. Burroughes also illustrated books by other writers, notably The Story of the Red Deer which was published bu the Gregynog Press in 1936 and for which she produced eleven colour prints.

Throughout the 1920s Burroughes lived with her partner Vere Hutchinson, an author who had five books published but died in 1931 after a protracted illness. Burroughes was elected a member of the Society of Women Artists in 1923 and became a member of the Royal Society of British Artists in 1925. She exhibited with the Fine Art Society in London and both the London Transport Museum and the Victoria & Albert Museum hold examples of her work.

Books illustrated
Books illustrated by Burroughes include,
 Queer Beasts at the Zoo by G Davidson, Allen & Unwin, 1927
 Queer Birds at the Zoo by G Davidson, Allen & Unwin, 1927
Gun Fodder by J. F. Snook, Allen & Unwin, 1930
 The Animal Lovers' Calendar, by Jenkins, 1930
 Fifty-One New Nursery Rhymes by Rose Fyleman, Methuen, 1931
 Tinkle the Cat by NC James, Dent, 1932
 Gardener's Frenzy by M Pallister, Methuen, 1933
 The Story of the Red-Deer by JW Fortescue, Gregynog Press, 1936

Books written and illustrated
Books written and illustrated by Burroughes include,
 The Amazing Adventures of Little Brown Bear, Methuen, 1930
 Jack Rabbit, Detective, Methuen, 1931
 Journeyings of Selina Squirrel and her Friends, Methuen, 1931
 The Odd Little Girl, Methuen, 1932
 Captain Seal's Treasure Hunt, Bodley Head, 1933
 More Adventures of the Odd Little Girl, Bodley Head, 1933
 Harris the Hare and His Own True Love, Bodley Head, 1933
 The Strange Adventures of Mary Jane Stubbs, Bodley Head, 1933
 The Home the Moles Built, Hutchinson, 1939
 The Little Black Rabbit, Hutchinson, 1940
 Teddy, the Little Refuge Mouse, Hutchinson, 1942
 The Pigs who Sailed Away, Hutchinson, 1944
 The Magic Herb, Hutchinson, 1945
 The Conceited Frog, Hutchinson, 1949
 The Little White Elephant, Hutchinson, 1953

References

1883 births
1963 deaths
20th-century British printmakers
20th-century English women artists
20th-century English painters
Alumni of the Slade School of Fine Art
Alumni of the Heatherley School of Fine Art
Artists from London
English children's book illustrators
English wood engravers
English LGBT painters
English lesbian artists
Lesbian painters
Women engravers
20th-century engravers